Christel Felgner (born 25 July 1942) is a retired German gymnast. She competed at the 1964 Summer Olympics in all artistic gymnastics events and finished in fourth place with the German team. Her best individual result was 30th place in the vault. From 1966 she competed under the name Christel Wunder-Felgner.

References

1942 births
Living people
German female artistic gymnasts
Gymnasts at the 1964 Summer Olympics
Olympic gymnasts of the United Team of Germany
Sportspeople from Halle (Saale)